Dolná Lehota (earlier) is a village and municipality in Brezno District, in the Banská Bystrica Region of central Slovakia.

History
The village was founded in 1358 by a certain Peter from Predajná. In historical records, the village was first mentioned in 1424 (1424 Petwrlehota, 1455 Lehota Petri, 1464 Petrik Lahathaya, 1528 Inferior Lehota).

Genealogical resources

The records for genealogical research are available at the state archive "Statny Archiv in Banska Bystrica, Slovakia"

 Roman Catholic church records (births/marriages/deaths): 1754-1938 (parish B)
 Lutheran church records (births/marriages/deaths): 1784-1927 (parish B

See also
 List of municipalities and towns in Slovakia

References

External links
https://web.archive.org/web/20080111223415/http://www.statistics.sk/mosmis/eng/run.html.  
http://www.e-obce.sk/obec/dolnalehota/dolna-lehota.html
Surnames of living people in Dolna Lehota

Villages and municipalities in Brezno District
1358 establishments in Europe
Populated places established in the 1350s